Marco Giovino is an American drummer. He was born in Boston, Massachusetts, and grew up in nearby Burlington, MA.

In 2003, Giovino accompanied in concerts the Welsh musician John Cale, and played on his album, HoboSapiens in the same year.

From 2010 to 2011 he was a member of the Band of Joy, led by Robert Plant, former member of Led Zeppelin. With the group in 2010 they recorded the album Band of Joy. This album was number 8 on Rolling Stone's list of the 30 Best Albums of 2010.

During his career he has collaborated with many other musicians, including Peter Parcek, GE Smith, Norah Jones, Kylie Harris, Malcolm Holcombe, and Patty Griffin.

References

External links
  Official website
  Marco Giovino at Allmusic

American rock drummers
Date of birth missing (living people)
Living people
Band of Joy members
Year of birth missing (living people)